The following are lists of makers of clarinets, clarinet mouthpieces, clarinet ligatures, and clarinet reeds.  Note that some of the following are simply brands for instruments from original equipment manufacturers.

Companies by specialty

Clarinets

Mouthpieces 

 Amati-Denak
 AW-Reeds GbR
 jj Babbitt
 Leblanc
 Leitner & Kraus
 Selmer
 Vandoren
 Yamaha Corporation

Reeds 
AW-Reeds GbR
Rico
Vandoren

Ligatures 
 Leblanc
 Vandoren
 Yamaha Corporation

Historical reproductions 
 Stephen Fox
 Schwenk & Seggelke

References

External links 
 

Clarinet